Beharbari Outpost is an Assamese Indian comedy television series which airs on Rengoni. The series revolves around Beharbari police station. The series first aired on 7 October 2013. It is the longest running series on the channel and in Assam.

Synopsis 
Police officers try to solve unique and sometimes outrageous cases while trying to espouse important values and morals.

Beharbari outpost is led by SI Pritam and features Constable KK, CID Mohan, Beauty Bailung, Moni Bou, Mukuta Da, Sushmita, Rakesh and many more characters. Each episode ends with a message to the public.

Cast  
 Siddhartha Sharma as Krishna Kamal Khatoniyar; a police constable, husband of Moni, Mukuta Deka's brother in law.
 Deepjyoti Keot as Mohan
 Sumki Kachari as Basumoti Beauty Bailung 
 Rintu Bora as Rakesh Hazarika, a computer operator
 Pritam Baruah as SI Pritam Khargharia, a sub inspector of police.
 Papori Borah as Moni Bou, Krishna Kamal Khatoniyar's Wife, Mukuta Deka's younger sister.
 Parvin Sultna as Sushmita Sen
 Seema Boruah as Toramai Nogoyani
 Kamal Thakuria as Kamal Thakuria, a homeguard
 Aswini Deka as Mukuta Deka, elder brother of Moni, Krishna Kamal Khatoniyar's brother in law.
 Anshuman Bhuyan as Purusuttam Garg
 Nishita Goswami as DSP Mulaghaboru, Deputy Superintendent of police
 Richa Chetry as Richa Chetry

Former Cast 
 Angushmita Gogoi as Neha
 Barsha Rani Bishaya  as ASI Bijuli Ma'am
 Hirak Kaushik Boruah as Lutukon
 Surya Krishna as Horo

References

External links

2013 Indian television series debuts
Assamese-language television shows
Indian television series